"The Russians Are Coming" is an episode of the BBC sitcom, Only Fools and Horses. It was first screened on 13 October 1981, as the final episode of series 1. In the episode, Del buys a nuclear fallout shelter and, anticipating a nuclear war, the Trotters decide to build it.

Synopsis
Del Boy purchases a pile of bricks and discovers several boxes of lead underneath. Rodney finds some old paperwork with the lead and discovers that it is intended for a do it yourself nuclear fallout shelter. The episode was first screened during the Soviet–Afghan War, and Rodney persuades Del that, with the fear of World War III looming, they should build the shelter rather than sell the lead. Del agrees to test out living in the shelter over the weekend.

Several potential locations for the shelter, including Grandad's allotment and Grandad's own idea of an area in the New Forest, prove unworkable as the trio are unable to beat the four-minute warning, due to being pulled over by the police.

The rest of the episode is set in the shelter, where the conversation turns to war and the potential aftermath of the impending conflict. Del suggests that the present generation of British youngsters have been "denied their birth right of a war", which sparks an angry response from Grandad, who gives a sombre "war is hell" speech. The episode ends with Del dreaming aloud of what could become of the world in the event of nuclear fallout, while the camera zooms out to reveal the location of the Trotters' fallout shelter; on the roof of their tower block, Nelson Mandela House.

Episode cast

Episode concept
The idea for the script was based on a true story which John Sullivan was reading about, which involved a group of people who did as the script suggested: purchased lead and built an air-raid shelter.

Music
Ronnie Hazlehurst: Original Theme Tune

Note: In the original series 1 broadcasts of Only Fools and Horses, the theme tune was very different to the version adopted from series 2, which became the standard version known today. Composed by Ronnie Hazlehurst, the original theme tune was a jazzy instrumental tune that played over the start and end credits. This tune was replaced in series 2 with a version written and sung by John Sullivan. After the initial run of series 1, all future re-runs replaced the Hazlehurst version with John Sullivan's to match the other series. The VHS/DVD versions all contain John Sullivan's version, and recordings with Hazlehurst's original tune are extremely rare, though it can be heard in a scene during episode 1 of the first series.

References

External links

Only Fools and Horses (series 1) episodes
1981 British television episodes
Television episodes about nuclear war and weapons